The 1828 United States presidential election in New Jersey took place between October 31 and December 2, 1828, as part of the 1828 United States presidential election. Voters chose eight representatives, or electors to the Electoral College, who voted for President and Vice President.

New Jersey voted for the National Republican candidate, John Quincy Adams, over the Democratic candidate, Andrew Jackson. Adams won New Jersey by a narrow margin of 4.26%.

Results

See also
 United States presidential elections in New Jersey

References

New Jersey
1828
1828 New Jersey elections